Tariku Girma Demisu (born 28 December 2001) is an Ethiopian taekwondo practitioner. He represented Ethiopia at the 2019 African Games held in Rabat, Morocco and he won the gold medal in the men's 63 kg event.

At the 2020 African Taekwondo Olympic Qualification Tournament held in Rabat, Morocco, he finished in third place in his event. He lost in the semi-finals against Abdelrahman Wael of Egypt.

References

External links 
 

Living people
2001 births
Place of birth missing (living people)
Ethiopian male taekwondo practitioners
African Games medalists in taekwondo
African Games gold medalists for Ethiopia
Competitors at the 2019 African Games
21st-century Ethiopian people